Colacovirus is a subgenus of viruses in the genus Alphacoronavirus, consisting of a single species, Bat coronavirus CDPHE15.

References

Virus subgenera
Alphacoronaviruses